is a train station on the Nankō Port Town Line (New Tram) in Suminoe-ku, Osaka, Japan.

Lines
Nankō Port Town Line (Station Number: P16)

Layout
There is an elevated island platform with two tracks. The station is completely walled in with glass walls.

Railway stations in Japan opened in 1981
Osaka Metro stations
Railway stations in Osaka Prefecture